"...and Roses and Roses" is a song written by Dorival Caymmi with English lyrics by Ray Gilbert, and performed by Andy Williams.  The song reached #4 on the U.S. adult contemporary chart and #36 on the Billboard chart in 1965.

Astrud Gilberto covered the song on her 1965 album, The Astrud Gilberto Album.

References

1965 singles
Andy Williams songs
Columbia Records singles
Songs written by Dorival Caymmi
1965 songs
Songs with lyrics by Ray Gilbert